FDU may refer to:

 Bandundu Airport, in the Democratic Republic of the Congo
 Fairleigh Dickinson University, in New Jersey, United States
 FDU materials, a class of structured mesoporous polymers
 Firemen and Deckhands' Union of New South Wales, an Australian trade union
 Fudan University, in Shanghai, China
 Führer der Unterseeboote, a naval office of the German Empire during World War I
 United Democratic Forces (Benin), a political alliance in Benin
 United Democratic Forces of Rwanda, a political alliance in Rwanda